Dive Coaster is a Floorless Dive roller coaster operating at Chimelong Paradise in China. It is built by Swiss coaster manufacturers Bolliger & Mabillard. A photo update on the parks website shows the coaster's first and second drop along with the water splash, the coaster's final brake run and a row of a train in the station with 10 seats in the row, as well as two pictures of SheiKra.

Ride Elements

Dive Coaster features a 90°, 197 foot vertical drop that exits into an Immelmann loop. After the Immelmann, riders will swoop down to the ground then climb a curve up to the block brake, then go over a second near vertical dive dropping into a tunnel. Upon exiting the tunnel, riders make an overbanked turn into a water splash feature which exits into a bunny hill then into a helix before entering the final brake run. This ride is very similar to Griffon and SheiKra (the first half being part of Griffon and the other part being SheiKra).

References

External links

Dive Coaster photo update on the parks website (Site is in Chinese)
Video of the press conference for Dive Coaster at the park (Site is in Chinese)

Steel roller coasters
Roller coasters manufactured by Bolliger & Mabillard
Roller coasters in China
Roller coasters introduced in 2008
Guangzhou Chimelong Tourist Resort
Dive Coasters manufactured by Bolliger & Mabillard